Stephen Donald Rucker (born June 27, 1949) is an American composer. Rucker studied piano with M. Mendelsohn of the Paris Conservatory.
He has composed and conducted for the London Symphony Orchestra in the animated film, Little Nemo: Adventures in Slumberland, with Thomas Chase. He has worked on film scores for animated series including Dexter's Laboratory, The Powerpuff Girls, and Jonny Quest. He also composed the score for another Cartoon Network series, Codename: Kids Next Door, with Thomas Chase. Rucker and Chase also provided musical score for Alvin and the Chipmunks.

He was awarded Best Original Score for the Civil War drama Josephine at the 2016 Richmond International Film Festival. He composed film trailer cues including  work for Goldwing (1978) Coco, Pirates of the Caribbean: Dead Men Tell No Tales, Hidden Figures, Jack Reacher: Never Go Back and Designated Survivor (ABC). He also continues to contribute for reality TV including Survivor and The Dog Whisperer.

Filmography

Television

Accolades

References

External links

 
 

1949 births
American male composers
21st-century American composers
Living people
American television composers
Musicians from Glendale, California
21st-century American male musicians
Animation composers
Annie Award winners